was a railway station on the Sasshō Line in Tōbetsu, Ishikari District, Hokkaidō, Japan, operated by the Hokkaido Railway Company (JR Hokkaido).

Lines
Ishikari-Kanazawa Station was served by the Sasshō Line.

Station layout
The station had a side platform serving one track. The unmanned station building is located at the south end the platform.

Adjacent stations

History
The station opened on 3 October 1935.

In December 2018, it was announced that the station would be closed on 7 May 2020, along with the rest of the non-electrified section of the Sasshō Line. The actual last service was on 17 April 2020 amid the COVID-19 outbreak.

References

Stations of Hokkaido Railway Company
Railway stations in Hokkaido Prefecture
Railway stations in Japan opened in 1935
Railway stations closed in 2020